Daniel Joseph Marion ( or  – May 12, 2022) was the commissioner of the Northwest Territories from March 26, 1999, until March 31, 2000.

References

1945 births
2022 deaths
Commissioners of the Northwest Territories
Northwest Territories Deputy Commissioners
People from Eastman Region, Manitoba